The 1895 Louisville Athletic Club football team was an American club football team that represented the Louisville Athletic Club during the 1895 college football season.  Under Coach Frew, who also played halfback, the team compiled a 2–4 record, and was outscored by their opponents by a total of 92 to 70.

Schedule

References

Louisville Athletic Club
Louisville Athletic Club football seasons
Louisville Athletic Club football